Aithikes is a former municipality in the Trikala regional unit, Thessaly, Greece. Since the 2011 local government reform it is part of the municipality Pyli, of which it is a municipal unit. The municipal unit has an area of 279.825 km2. Population 1,022 (2011). The seat of the municipality is in Elati.

References

Populated places in Trikala (regional unit)